K Rock 95.5 (call sign: 3CAT; stylised as K rock 95.5 and previously as K-Rock) is a commercial FM radio station based in Geelong, Australia. K Rock operates a mainstream Top 40 playlist.

K Rock’s football coverage mainly consists of Australian Football League matches involving the Geelong Football Club.

K Rock shares transmitter facilities with sister station 93.9 Bay FM (along with 94.7 The Pulse and 96.3 Rhema FM), broadcasting from a transmitter on top of Murradoc Hill on the Bellarine Peninsula. The license area covers the Greater Geelong area, Werribee and Western Melbourne, The Golden Plains, and the Surf Coast. K Rock also streams online via their website.

On-Air lineup
6-9am: Fresh Daily with Tom, Lingy & Loggy
10.00am-3pm: Ben Rogers
3-4 - Tom, Lingy & Loggy - arvo show
4-7pm: Tim & Jess

History

3GL
From 1930 to 1990, K Rock was known as 3GL on the AM band, broadcasting first on 1400 kHz, then 1350 kHz and later 1341 kHz. Although based in Geelong, it was notable for being received over most of the Melbourne metropolitan area. 

3GL gave Happy Hammond his start in broadcasting in 1948 as a breakfast announcer. While at 3GL, Hammond also made his first TV appearance in 1948, long before the Tarax Show, as part of an exhibition using closed-circuit TV equipment for trial purposes. Towards the end of its time as an AM station, 3GL used the "3GL on the West Coast" slogan and associated jingles, many sung by Mike Brady.

For many years, 3GL was based in James Street, Geelong, but relocated after being granted the right to convert to the FM band in 1990.

3GL was offered an FM conversion upon the entry to the Geelong market of competitor BAY FM in December 1989. 3GL converted to FM to allow equal competition in the Geelong regional market, with the management of the former Geelong AM service agreeing to transfer the service to the FM band in 1990. The station was going to drop the 3GL call sign in favour of 3CAT (after the Geelong Cats), as proposed by the radio station's head of football commentary Ted Whitten (who at the time was in the early stages of his battle with cancer). However, the 3CAT call-sign never made it to air, being changed to K rock on the eve of the station's commencement on the FM band at 95.5 MHz, on 27 January 1990.

K Rock
After simulcasting on both 1341 AM and 95.5 FM for two weeks, K Rock went to air at midday on the Saturday of the Australia Day weekend 1990, the first announcer to speak on the new FM station was Ian 'Strawny' Strachan.

K Rock was also Australia's first FM station to cover AFL football . With a lineup that included Ted Whitten, Sam Kekovich, Billy Brownless and Dwayne Russell, K Rock continues to focus on Geelong Football Club matches.

In 1996, K Rock and Bay FM achieved a record 11 RAWARD nominations in the programming area, winning 5 awards—an achievement equalled that year only by Melbourne's Fox FM.  During this period, despite the strength of all Melbourne radio stations reaching the listening area, nearly 1 in 3 Geelong people listened to K Rock.  In recent years, the ratings of K Rock have declined to the point where a 2016 ratings survey showed an audience of 8.9 per cent in the local area—behind the ABC and sister station Bay FM.

Originally owned by the Hoyts organisation, which operated Triple M brand in Australia, K Rock was sold to Sydney-based Grant Broadcasting in the mid-1990s.

Shortly after this, the station purchased the rival Geelong station, 93.9 Bay FM, moving it from its Ryrie Street studios to co-locate in the K Rock studios in Moorabool Street, Geelong. Both K Rock and Bay FM now operate from the same studios in Geelong's CBD.

In 2007, K Rock celebrated 75 years of broadcasting 3GL and K Rock Footy, culminating in a week of broadcasting at various events as the city celebrated the first AFL Premiership victory by the Geelong Football Club in 44 years.

In 2010, K Rock underwent a major format change which re-focused the music toward a younger audience and minimised the station's traditional rock base.

References

Contemporary hit radio stations in Australia
Grant Broadcasters
Radio stations established in 1930
Radio stations established in 1990
Radio stations in Geelong